Garcinia rubro-echinata is a species of flowering plant in the family Clusiaceae. It is found only in India.

References

Endemic flora of India (region)
Vulnerable plants
rubro-echinata
Taxonomy articles created by Polbot
Taxobox binomials not recognized by IUCN